"Love Child" is a 1990 single by Scottish alternative rock group Goodbye Mr Mackenzie. It was their debut single release for EMI's Parlophone record label. "Love Child" was taken from the band's second studio album Hammer and Tongs which was released the following year.

In 1991, after Goodbye Mr Mackenzie had signed to Gary Kurfirst's Radioactive Records, "Love Child" was featured on their debut international album release, the self-titled Goodbye Mr Mackenzie.

Track listings

UK 7" single Parlophone R 6247
UK Cassette single Parlophone TCR 6247

"Love Child"
"Heroes" 	

UK 12" single Parlophone 12 R 6247

"Love Child"
"Heroes"
"You Generous Thing You (Live)"1	

UK 12" single <small>''Parlophone 12 RX 6247 (with free poster)</small>

"Love Child - Dance mix"
"Heroes"
"Goodwill City - Cava 12" mix"
"The Rattler (Live)"1

UK CD single Parlophone CDR 6247

"Love Child"
"Heroes" 	
"Goodwill City - Cava 12" mix"
"You Generous Thing You (Live)"1

1Recorded live at the Town and Country Club, London on 20 June 1989.

Charts

References

External links
Goodbye Mr. Mackenzie website
"Love Child" discography

1990 singles
1990 songs
Goodbye Mr Mackenzie songs
Parlophone singles